KJRZ-LP (105.3 FM) was a radio station in Libby, Montana. It was owned and operated by the Libby Area Chamber of Commerce.

KJRZ-LP operated with 100 watts (LPFM) Class L1, and used a non-directional antenna. The transmitter was in Libby at 6th and Commerce Way. Its license was cancelled by the U.S. Federal Communications Commission.

External links
 Libby Chamber
 

JRZ-LP
JRZ-LP
Defunct community radio stations in the United States
Defunct radio stations in the United States
JRZ-LP